Scărișoara River may refer to the following rivers in Romania:

 Scărișoara, a tributary of the Măcriș in Gorj County
 Scărișoara, a tributary of the Motru in Gorj County
 Scărișoara, a tributary of the Piva in Gorj County
 Scărișoara, a tributary of the Suseni in Gorj County
 Scărișoara, a tributary of the Valea Neagră in Satu Mare County